Georgy Girl is a 1966 British romantic comedy-drama, starring Lynn Redgrave in the title role, with Charlotte Rampling, Alan Bates, and James Mason. Directed by Silvio Narizzano, the film was based on the 1965 novel by Margaret Forster.

The plot follows the story of a virginal young woman in 1960s Swinging London who is faced with a dilemma when she is pursued by her father's older employer and the young lover of her promiscuous, pregnant flatmate.

Plot
The opening credits show the title character walking through the streets of London and being tempted into a hairdressers where she has her hair set in a far more contemporary style. She immediately changes her mind, and runs through the streets until she reaches a public lavatory. Once there, she submerges her hair in a sink-full of water, happy to return to her previously unkempt hairstyle.

Georgina ("Georgy") Parkin (Lynn Redgrave) is a 22-year-old Londoner who has considerable musical talent, is well-educated, and has an engaging, unpretentious character. At the same time, she believes herself to be plain and slightly overweight, she dresses haphazardly, and she is incredibly naïve on the subjects of love and flirtation. She has never had a boyfriend. She has an inventive imagination and loves children.

Her parents are live-in employees of successful businessman James Leamington (James Mason), who runs a children's home. Leamington is 49 and has a loveless, childless marriage with Ellen (Rachel Kempson). He watched Georgy grew up and treated her as if he were her second father. He provided for her private education at a Swiss finishing school and for a studio in his home, where she teaches dance to children. Leamington thinks Georgy "owes him" for all he has done.

As Georgy has become a young woman, his feelings for her have become more than fatherly: James offers Georgy a legal contract, proposing to supply her with the luxuries of life in return for her becoming his mistress. Georgy sidesteps his proposal by never giving him a direct response; Leamington's business-like language and manner (and awkward inability to express any affection for her) leave her cold.

Georgy's flatmate is the beautiful Meredith (Charlotte Rampling), who is a violinist in an orchestra, but is otherwise a shallow woman who lives for her own pleasures. She treats the meekly compliant Georgy like an unpaid servant. Georgy has a crush on Meredith's boyfriend Jos Jones (Alan Bates) and is happy to accommodate Meredith in order to spend time with Jos. She cooks for him and they play Scrabble together.

When Meredith discovers that she is pregnant by Jos, they get married. She tells him bluntly that she has aborted two of his children, but she wants to marry because she is "bored." Jos moves in with the two young women. He becomes disillusioned with Meredith and begins to find himself attracted to Georgy, who convinces Leamington to buy several expensive items for the baby's care.

While in the midst of an argument with Meredith over her cavalier attitude to her pregnancy, Jos suddenly kisses Georgy and tells her that he loves her. Georgy flees the apartment onto the streets of London, where Jos follows her, screaming over and over again that he loves her as he pursues her.

The two return to the flat, where they have sex, after which there is a knock at the door by Peggy, a friend of Meredith, who tells Jos that Meredith has gone to the hospital to give birth. Jos and Georgy go to the hospital, where Georgy tries to comfort Meredith while she is in labour. Jos and Georgy's secret love affair continues.

Meredith gives birth to a daughter they name Sara. Because she has no interest in the baby and has tired of Jos, she announces that she plans to put the child up for adoption and divorce him.

Georgy and Jos set up home together in the flat, caring for baby Sara and living as a common-law married couple. It becomes clear that Georgy cares more for the baby than for having an adult relationship with Jos. Their relationship ends when Jos tires of a father's responsibilities; he abandons her and his baby. Now that Georgy is the sole caregiver of a baby to whom she has no blood ties, Social Services wishes to remove baby Sara from her care.

In the recent past, Mr Leamington's wife suddenly died. Leamington, who was unable to express his true feelings for Georgy while his wife was alive, now finds himself free to express his love for her, so he proposes marriage. Georgy accepts because this will allow her to keep Sara. The two marry despite the difference in their backgrounds and ages. They officially adopt Sara, making Georgy a mother. As the newlyweds are chauffeured away from their wedding, Georgy ignores her new husband, devoting all her attention to baby Sara.

Cast

 Lynn Redgrave as Georgina "Georgy" Parkin 
 James Mason as James Leamington
 Alan Bates as Jos Jones
 Charlotte Rampling as Meredith
 Bill Owen as Ted Parkin
 Clare Kelly as Doris Parkin
 Rachel Kempson (Lynn Redgrave's mother) as Ellen Leamington
 Denise Coffey as Peg
 Peggy Thorpe-Bates as Hospital Sister
 Dandy Nichols as Hospital Nurse
 Dorothy Alison as Health Visitor
 Terence Soall as Salesman
 Ian Dunn as Baby Sara

Production

Locations
Several scenes were filmed in north London, in Belsize Park and Little Venice, notably outside a canalside house on Maida Avenue.

Title song
The title song "Georgy Girl", written by Tom Springfield and Jim Dale, was recorded by Australian band The Seekers. A single release of the song (with somewhat different lyrics) topped the singles chart in Australia, and was a top 10 hit in both the UK and the U.S. (#2 for two weeks). It was the 56th biggest British hit of 1967, and the 57th biggest American hit of 1967. It became a gold record and was nominated for an Academy Award in the Best Original Song from a Motion Picture category.

Reception
The film was successful at the box office. By 1967, it had earned an estimated $7 million in the United States and $6 million in other countries. By the end of 1967, it had earned $7,330,000 in rentals in North America according to rentals accruing to the distributors.

Awards and nominations

Adaptation
In 1970, the film was the basis for an unsuccessful Broadway musical titled Georgy.

It was adapted for BBC Radio 4 in 2013 by Rhiannon Tise.

Notes

References

External links
 
 
 

1966 films
1960s romantic comedy-drama films
British black-and-white films
British romantic comedy-drama films
Columbia Pictures films
Films based on British novels
Films based on romance novels
Films directed by Silvio Narizzano
Films featuring a Best Musical or Comedy Actress Golden Globe winning performance
Films set in London
1966 drama films
1960s English-language films
1960s British films